Laarbi Batma (or Laarbi Batma) (born in Chaouia; 1948 - 7 February 1997) was a Moroccan musician, poet, singer, writer, actor, and the front man of the group Nass El Ghiwane.

Early life 
Batma grew up in the Hay Mohammadi neighborhood in Casablanca.

Batma was very much influenced by the music style of the mawsims of his native region that he used to frequent as a child.

Nass El Ghiwane 
Batma was a founding member of Nass El Ghiwane. He was a vocalist and percussionist for the group until his death in 1997. He was considered the architect of the group.

Cinema 
Batma was the lead actor in the Moroccan movie Le jour du forain, directed by Driss Kettani and Abdelkrim Derkaoui. He also starred in Ahmed el-Maanouni's Trances, a documentary on Nass El Ghiwane.

See also 
 Nass El Ghiwane 
 Hay Mohammadi

References

 "Adieu Batma", obituary of Laarbi Batma in Jeune Afrique, 1997 Mar-May 
 Abdallah Mdarhri Alaoui, Aspects du roman marocain, 1950-2003: approche historique, thématique et esthétique,ed. Éditions zaouia, 2006, p. 65

External links 
 Larbi Batma on IMDb

1948 births
1997 deaths
20th-century Moroccan male singers
20th-century Moroccan male actors
Moroccan autobiographers
Moroccan folk singers
Moroccan male poets
Moroccan songwriters
People from Casablanca
20th-century Moroccan musicians
Moroccan male film actors
Date of birth missing